The  is the 18th edition of the Japan Film Professional Awards. It awarded the best of 2008 in film. The ceremony did not take place in this year.

Awards 
Best Film: Kiss
Best Director: Kōji Wakamatsu (United Red Army)
Best Actress: Eiko Koike (Kiss)
Best Actor: Tatsuya Fujiwara (Chameleon)
Best New Director: Kenji Nakanishi (Aoi Tori)
Best Distinguished Service: Takeo Kimura (For his Guinness World Record for the oldest debut as a feature film director, and his longtime work.)
Special: Kenichi Matsuyama (Detroit Metal City)
Special: Shinjuku Joy Cinema (The theatre closed in 2009.)

10 best films
 Kiss (Kunitoshi Manda)
 Tokyo Sonata (Kiyoshi Kurosawa)
 United Red Army (Kōji Wakamatsu)
 All Around Us (Ryōsuke Hashiguchi)
 Hito no Sex o Warauna (Nami Iguchi)
 Still Walking (Hirokazu Kore-eda)

References

External links
  

Japan Film Professional Awards
2009 in Japanese cinema
Japan Film Professional Awards